The loreal pit is the deep depression, or fossa, in the loreal area on either side of the head in pit vipers (crotaline snakes). The area is located behind the nostril and in front of the eye, but below the line that runs between the centers of each. It is the external opening to an extremely sensitive infrared detecting organ. The loreal pit is bordered by lacunal scales. The loreal pit also functions as part of a thermal regulating system, enabling pit vipers to maintain their body temperature.

References

Snake anatomy